Slobodan Ćendić (Kragujevac, 28 August 1938) is a former Yugoslavian/Serbian football manager resident in Germany since 1970.

He was among others the manager of FC Schalke 04, 1. FC Saarbrücken, Alemannia Aachen, and Hannover 96.

References

External links

1938 births
Serbian football managers
FC Schalke 04 managers
Alemannia Aachen managers
Living people
FC Augsburg managers
Stuttgarter Kickers managers
1. FC Saarbrücken managers
SV Waldhof Mannheim managers
FC 08 Homburg managers
Hannover 96 managers
SC Preußen Münster managers
Rot-Weiß Oberhausen managers
SV Darmstadt 98 managers